Elisabeth of Saxony (4 February 1830 – 14 August 1912) was a Princess of Saxony who married the second son of the King of Sardinia. She was the mother of Margherita, Queen of Italy.

Early life and family

She was born in Dresden, capital of Saxony, as daughter of King John of Saxony and his wife Princess Amalie of Bavaria. Her paternal grandparents were Prince Maximilian of Saxony and Carolina of Parma. Her maternal grandparents were King Maximilian I of Bavaria and Karoline of Baden.

Marriages and issue
On 22 April 1850, she married, in Dresden Cathedral, Prince Ferdinand, 1st Duke of Genoa, second son of King Charles Albert of Sardinia and Maria Theresa of Austria and Tuscany. Their marriage was a dynastic arrangement, and it was generally held to be loveless.

The couple had two children:

On 10 February 1855 her husband died in Turin, leaving Elizabeth a widow at the age of 25.

Before her second year of widowhood had ended, she remarried on 4 October 1856 with her chamberlain Niccolò Bernoud, Marchese di Rapallo. They married secretly, before her period of official mourning was over. This act so infuriated her brother-in-law Victor Emmanuel II of Italy that he ordered her into virtual exile and disallowed her from seeing her two children. They were later reunited however.

In 1882, her second husband committed suicide. Court gossip had often hinted that their marriage was unhappy, and his suicide added fuel to these stories. Elisabeth had no children from her second marriage.

Death
Elisabeth suffered an attack of apoplexy in 1910, which caused her health to quickly deteriorate. She died in Piedmont, Kingdom of Italy on 14 August 1912.

Ancestry

References

House of Wettin
Saxon princesses
Italian princesses
Princesses of Savoy
Duchesses of Genoa
Nobility from Dresden
1830 births
1912 deaths
Burials at the Basilica of Superga
German Roman Catholics
Albertine branch
Daughters of kings